James Carpenter (born April 14, 1962) is an American fencer. He competed in the individual and team épée events at the 1996 Summer Olympics.

References

External links
 

1962 births
Living people
American male épée fencers
Olympic fencers of the United States
Fencers at the 1996 Summer Olympics
People from Canton, Connecticut
Sportspeople from Connecticut
Pan American Games medalists in fencing
Pan American Games silver medalists for the United States
Pan American Games bronze medalists for the United States
Fencers at the 1991 Pan American Games
Fencers at the 1995 Pan American Games